Number 1 is second album by the band O-Zone. It consists of the following songs:

Track listing
"Numai tu" (Only you) – 4:00
"Dar, Unde esti" (But, where are you?) - 4:02
"Sarbatoarea Noptilor De Vara" (Summer Nights Festival) - 3:51
"Number 1" – 3:40
"Nopţi fără somn" (Sleepless Nights) – 3:52
"Am să te chem" (I'll call you) – 3:31
"Nu Ma Las De Limba Noastra" (I do not give up our language) - 3:50
"Number 1 (Funny Version)"  – 3:55
"Despre tine" (About you) – 3:47
"VIP"  – 2:48

2002 albums
O-Zone albums